Paul Wroblewski is a British television director. He directed many TV programmes and shows, including one series of BAFTA-winning television show Jeopardy^.

Career
Jeopardy won in BAFTA's Children's Drama section. Tim O'Mara created and directed the series under series producer Andy Rowley and Wark Clements executive Richard Langridge. Both worked on all three series shot in Sydney and Gold Coast, Australia.

In 2009  The Bill received an award for the production team -their first BAFTA award after 26 years together. The award was in the 'Continuing Drama' category. Wroblewski was one of the directors on the series.

At the 2011 BAFTA awards, he gained his 3rd BAFTA for The Only Way Is Essex winner in the category 'YouTube Audience Award'.

Filmography

Director
Emmerdale (unknown episodes)
Brookside (unknown episodes)
EastEnders (10 episodes, 1997–2006)
Casualty (9 episodes, 1998–2006)
Holby City (4 episodes, 1999–2001)
The Knock (unknown episodes, 2000)
Peak Practice (4 episodes, 2000)
Silent Witness (2 episodes, 2002)
Jeopardy (2002)
Blue Murder (pilot episode, 2003–2008)
Patrick's Planet (2005)
The Bill (9+ episodes, 2006–2009)
Desperados (2007) (unknown episodes)
As the Bell Rings (unknown episodes)
The Bill (unknown episodes, 2010)
The Only Way Is Essex (unknown episodes, 2010–2011)
Hollyoaks (unknown episodes, 2011)

References

External links

Paul Wroblewski
BAFTA Children's Winners

British television directors
Living people
Year of birth missing (living people)